Flame-Spray Industries, Inc. is a thermal spray company, that invented the plasma transferred wire arc thermal spraying process. They received the 2009 IPO National Inventor of the Year award for this process. Flame-spray Industries is located in Port Washington, New York and its primary industry is thermal spray technologies for engine coating.

Flame-Spray and Ford Motor Company developed a production ready version of this technology which improves fuel efficiency because of the reduced weight in automobiles.

References

External links
Company website

Manufacturing companies of the United States
Engineering companies of the United States
Manufacturing companies based in New York (state)